Paul Pry may refer to:

 Paul Pry (play), 1825 English play
 Paul Pry (newspaper), published 1831–1836 by Anne Royall
 The Adventures of Paul Pry, nine stories by author Erle Stanley Gardner
 Paul Pry, pseudonym of artist William Heath
 Paul Pry Rock, now Little Alcatraz, a rock in the San Francisco Bay

Pry, Paul